Princess Marie Eleonore of Albania, Princess of Wied (Marie Eleonore Elisabeth Cecilie Mathilde Lucie Prinzessin von Wied; 19 February 190929 September 1956) was the only daughter of William, Prince of Albania and his wife Princess Sophie of Schönburg-Waldenburg.

She held the title of Princess of Albania. She was also styled Donika, in homage to Donika Kastrioti.

Family and early life
Princess Marie Eleonore of Wied was born on 19 February 1909 at Potsdam, Brandenburg, Prusia.

She was the sister of Carol Victor, Hereditary Prince of Albania.

Marriage
She married, firstly, Prince Alfred of Schönburg-Waldenburg (1905-1941), son of Prince Heinrich of Schönburg-Waldenburg and Princess Olga of Löwenstein-Wertheim-Freudenberg, on 16 November 1937 at Munich, Bavaria, Germany.

She married, secondly, Ion Octavian Bunea (1899-1977), son of Aureliu Bunea, on 5 February 1949 at Bucharest, Romania.

She died without issue at age 47, on 29 September 1956 at a communist internment camp, Miercurea Ciuc, Romania.

Ancestry

Notes and sources

Further reading
Genealogisches Handbuch des Adels, Fürstliche Häuser, Reference: 1991 2

1909 births
1956 deaths
People from Potsdam
House of Wied-Neuwied
Albanian nobility
German emigrants to Albania